Elias Ymer was the defending champion and successfully defended his title, defeating Yannick Maden 6–3, 7–6(7–5) in the final.

Seeds

Draw

Finals

Top half

Bottom half

References
Main Draw
Qualifying Draw

Internationaux de Tennis de Vendée - Singles
2018 Singles